Noel Frederick Charles Cutting (4 December 1921 – 1997) was an English professional footballer who played as an inside forward.

Career

Cutting most notably played for Colchester United, but also spent time at Football League sides Leicester and Norwich, although he did not register any league appearances. After playing for Colchester, he went on to play for Great Yarmouth Town.

Honours

Club
Colchester United
 Southern Football League runner-up: 1949–50
 Southern Football League Cup winner: 1949–50
 Southern Football League Cup runner-up: 1947–48, 1948–49

References

External links
 
 Fred Cutting at Colchester United Archive Database

1921 births
1997 deaths
People from North Walsham
English footballers
Association football inside forwards
Leicester City F.C. players
Norwich City F.C. players
Colchester United F.C. players
Great Yarmouth Town F.C. players
English Football League players